Eduardo C. Robreno (born 1945 in Havana, Cuba) is a senior United States district judge of the United States District Court for the Eastern District of Pennsylvania and the first Cuban-American to be appointed as a federal judge.

Education

Robreno received his Bachelor of Arts degree from Westfield State College in 1967, a Master of Arts from University of Massachusetts Amherst in 1969 and his Juris Doctor from Rutgers School of Law–Camden in 1978. He served as an attorney for the Antitrust Division of the United States Department of Justice in Philadelphia, Pennsylvania, from 1978 to 1981. He was in private practice in Philadelphia from 1981 to 1992. He was a lecturer at Rutgers School of Law from 1992 to 1996.

Federal judicial service

Robreno is a senior United States district judge of the United States District Court for the Eastern District of Pennsylvania. Robreno was nominated by President George H. W. Bush on November 26, 1991, to a seat vacated by Judge Louis H. Pollak. He was confirmed by the United States Senate on June 26, 1992, and received commission on June 30, 1992. He took the oath of office and commenced service on July 27, 1992. He took senior status on August 31, 2013.

Multi-district litigation
Robreno is the third judge to manage the massive Multi-District Litigation of over 10,000 federal asbestos claims. These claims were all individually transferred over nearly two decades from local state courts on a variety of grounds, and Robreno has been praised for allowing many cases to go forward and have other dormant cases dismissed.

See also
List of first minority male lawyers and judges in Pennsylvania
List of first minority male lawyers and judges in the United States
List of Hispanic/Latino American jurists

References

Sources

Eduardo C. Robreno via FindLaw

1945 births
Living people
Cuban emigrants to the United States
Hispanic and Latino American judges
Judges of the United States District Court for the Eastern District of Pennsylvania
Pennsylvania state court judges
Rutgers School of Law–Camden alumni
United States Department of Justice lawyers
United States district court judges appointed by George H. W. Bush
20th-century American judges
21st-century American judges
University of Massachusetts Amherst alumni
Westfield State University alumni
American judges of Cuban descent